Yi Jeon, Prince Yeongsan (Hangul: 영산군 이전, Hanja: 寧山君 李恮; 22 September 1490 – 11 June 1538) was a prince of the Joseon Dynasty. He was the son of King Seongjong of Joseon and Royal Consort Sugyong.

Life 
Yi Jeon was born on 22 September 1490, 21st year of King Seongjong of Joseon, as the second son of King Seongjong and Royal Consort Sugyong. He had 2 full sisters and 1 full brother.
 
Yi Jeon was good at archery and horseback riding and loved hunting. He is considered as one of the most outstanding princes of King Seongjong. The King Jungjong always protected Prince Yeongsan in front of the ministers.

In the 3rd year of King Jungjong (1508), Sin Bok-ui and Dong Cheong-rye were conspirated to treason and allegedly Yi Jeon was involved, but the prince denied this. 

In the year 1513 (the 8th year of King Jungjong), when Park Yeong-mu and Sin Yun-mu, who conspired against treason, Yi Jeon was again mentioned. Accordingly, Prince Yeongsan asked to be punished but King Jungjong did not. The ministers requested that Prince Yeongsan, who was involved in the treason, be sent abroad but Jungjong did not accept.

In 1519 (14th year of King Jungjong), he and his half-brother Yi Don caused a scandal for immoral behavior. Park Soo-moon asked Jungjong to control the actions of the princes.

In 1521 (16th year of King Jungjong), Prince Yeongsan was mentioned along with Yi Don in the rebellion of Prince Gyeongmyeong (1489–1526). The ministers asked King Jungjong to punish the princes, but the King protected them.

He died on June 11, 1538 (33rd year of King Jungjong). He was buried in Seoul.

Family 

 Father: King Seongjong of Joseon
 Mother: Royal Consort Sugyong of the Cheongsong Sim clan (숙용 심씨) (1465–1515)
Sister: Princess Gyeongsun (1482–?) (경순옹주)
 Sister: Princess Sukhye (1486–1525) (숙혜옹주)
 Brother: Yi Gwan, Prince Yiseong (1489–1552) (이관 이성군)
 Consorts and issues:
 Princess Consort Geumneung of the Cheongsong Sim clan (금릉군부인 청송 심씨, 金陵郡夫人 靑松沈氏) (?–4 May 1524)
 Daughter: Yi Ui-jeong (이의정, 李懿貞) (1508–?)
 Daughter: Yi Gyeong-jeong (이경정, 李敬貞) (1510–?)
 Princess Consort Gyoseong of the Gyeongju Jeong clan (교성군부인 경주 정씨, 交城郡夫人 慶州鄭氏) (?–8 May)
 Princess Consort Hamheung of the Hwang clan (함흥군부인 황씨)
 Son: Prince Jangheung (장흥군상, 1520–?)
 Daughter: Unknown (1522–?)
 Concubine: Unknown
 Son: Prince Euncheon (은천군 정; 1514–?)
 Concubine: Unknown
 Son: Prince Eumseong (음성도정 유, 1534–1588)
 Concubine: Unknown
 Son: Prince Yangsang (양산군 록, 1517–1573)
 3 daughters
 Concubine : Unknown
 Son: Yi Mak-ji (이막지, 1518–?)

References 

1490 births
1538 deaths
Korean princes
House of Yi
Joseon dynasty